Kathryn L. "Kate" Davis (born February 4, 1991) is an American singer, songwriter, and bassist.

Early life
Davis started learning music on the violin. She moved to the Pacific Northwest in middle school and began to study the double bass. She played violin and bass in the Portland Youth Philharmonic. She was named a Presidential Scholar in the Arts in 2009 through the YoungArts national arts scholarship program while at West Linn High School in West Linn, Oregon.

Music career
Davis released the album Introducing Kate Davis in 2008. She enrolled at the Manhattan School of Music in 2009, concentrating on jazz and classic American songs, releasing a Christmas album in 2009 and a live album in 2010. She collaborated with guitarist Gabe Schnider and drummer Conor Szymanski, these songs can heard on Michael Feinstein's NPR show Song Travels. In 2012, she was recognized by ASCAP with the Robert Alan Award for new songwriters. She has said that learning the double bass was difficult, but after learning songs from the Great American Songbook, she was able to translate that knowledge to create her own style. 

In 2019, she released her fourth album, Trophy. Her fifth album is due in 2021: a complete cover of Retired Boxer by outsider artist Daniel Johnston. Davis's version is titled Strange Boy, and is planned to benefit for the mental health charity Hi How Are You Project. She posted "Oh No" to SoundCloud as the lead single in November 2020.

As featured performer
 In 2012, Davis gave a talk and performed music at a TEDx conference in Portland, Oregon.
 Davis was recognized by MTV as one of the "Fifteen Fresh Females to Rule Pop" in 2014.
 In September 2014, Davis sang a cover version of "All About That Bass" by Meghan Trainor while playing double bass for Scott Bradlee's Postmodern Jukebox video channel; Bradlee played piano and Dave Tedeschi played drums on their 1940s jazz-style interpretation, called "All About That (Upright) Bass". After three months on YouTube their version had received eight million hits.
 In December 2014, Davis appeared on PBS NewsHour to perform and to talk about her career.
 She appeared on the PBS special American Voices with Renée Fleming  in January 2015. Davis stepped in at the last minute for Grammy-winner Kurt Elling when he became ill with laryngitis and couldn't perform.

Discography
 Introducing Kate Davis (2008)
 A Kate Davis Holiday (2009)
 Live at Jimmy Mak's (2010)
 Trophy (2019)
Strange Boy (2021)

External links
 Official website

References

1991 births
Living people
People from West Linn, Oregon
Singers from Oregon
21st-century American singers
21st-century American women singers
21st-century double-bassists
American women jazz singers
American jazz double-bassists
American jazz singers
Manhattan School of Music alumni
Women double-bassists